Julia Silge (born June 10, 1978) is an American data scientist and software engineer. She has developed tools for statistical modelling in the R programming language, including the text mining package tidytext. Silge currently works for RStudio.

Education and career
Silge studied physics at Texas A&M University, graduating in 2000. She obtained her M.A. (2002) and PhD (2005) in astronomy from the University of Texas at Austin. She was an adjunct professor at University of New Haven and Quinnipiac University from 2006 to 2008.

Silge has worked as a data scientist for several companies, most recently Stack Overflow and RStudio. At Stack Overflow, she researched the popularity of different programming languages and skills for technologists. She also began working on tidytext, an R package for text mining, with colleague David Robinson. Their book Text Mining with R: A Tidy Approach (2017) drew on examples of text analysis ranging from Jane Austen novels, popular songs, NASA metadata, and Twitter archives. 

In February 2017, Silge made the news when she used a note attached to a pizza delivery to contact her senator Orrin Hatch to object to the nomination of Betsy DeVos as Secretary of Education, after failing to reach Hatch by phone.

Selected publications

References

External links
 
 

1978 births
Living people
American statisticians
Women data scientists
Texas A&M University alumni
University of Texas at Austin alumni
R (programming language) people